Roland R. Wright (30 March 1919 – 19 October 2015) was a brigadier general of the United States Air Force who was a pilot during World War II, the Korean War and the Vietnam War.

During World War II, Wright was assigned to the 364th Fighter Squadron, 357th Fighter Group where he flew the P-51 Mustang. Wright had three confirmed aerial victories, one of which was against a Me 262—the eighth to have ever been shot down. All three P-51 Mustangs he flew were dubbed the 'Mormon Mustang'. Wright eventually reached the rank of brigadier general, retiring in 1976. He was also one of the first members of the Utah Air National Guard.

Wright was a member of the Church of Jesus Christ of Latter-day Saints (LDS Church). Prior to joining the Air Force he served as a missionary in the Northern States Mission, headquartered in Chicago. After retiring, Wright served as the president of the New York New York Mission from 1977 to 1980 and as director of the Washington DC Temple Visitors Center from 1991 until 1993.

On October 18, 2014, Wright was honored by the Utah Air National Guard when the Utah Air National Guard Base was formally renamed to the Roland R. Wright Air National Guard Base. A remake of his plane currently resides at Legacy Flight Museum where it is flown by pilot John K. Bagley. Wright died in October 2015.

Notes

References
Church News, Nov. 14, 2009, p. 14.
website about Roland Wright and the Mormon Mustang
short article about Wright
Meridian Magazine article that mentions Wright
Saints at War site
Vertigo 
Archived Interview with Roland R. Wright; BYU Special Collections

1919 births
2015 deaths
20th-century Mormon missionaries
American leaders of the Church of Jesus Christ of Latter-day Saints
United States Air Force personnel of the Korean War
United States Air Force personnel of the Vietnam War
American Mormon missionaries in the United States
United States Army Air Forces pilots of World War II
Mission presidents (LDS Church)
United States Army Air Forces officers
United States Air Force generals